Carlotta Barilli (2 September 1935 – 15 July 2020) was an Italian actress. She was born in Parma, Italy. Barilli was known for her roles in Ragazzi del Juke-Box (1959), Howlers in the Dock (1960) and La commare secca (1962). She appeared in the film Novecento, directed by Bernardo Bertolucci.

Granddaughter of the famous music critic and composer, Bruno Barilli, she first went to join roles in theater  and radio from the 1960's to 1970's. This included starring in the 1961 radio performance Adelchi alongside Vittorio Gassman and again with him later in film roles in Un Marziano a Roma.

Barilli died on 15 July 2020 in Rome, aged 84.

References

1935 births
2020 deaths
Italian film actresses
Italian television actresses
Italian stage actresses
Actors from Parma
20th-century Italian actresses